Daniel Ntesa Zitani, often referred to as Ntesa Dalienst (30 Oct 1946 - 23 Sep 1996) was an African music recording artist, composer and vocalist, in the Democratic Republic of the Congo (DRC). He was once a member of the soukous band TPOK Jazz, led by François Luambo Makiadi, which dominated the Congolese music scene from the 1950s through the 1980s.

See also
 Franco Luambo Makiadi
 Sam Mangwana
 Josky Kiambukuta
 Simaro Lutumba
 Ndombe Opetum
 Youlou Mabiala
 Mose Fan Fan
 Wuta Mayi
 TPOK Jazz
 List of African musicians

References

External links
 Overview of Composition of TPOK Jazz
 Ntesa Dalienst biography

Democratic Republic of the Congo musicians
Soukous musicians
TPOK Jazz members
1946 births
1996 deaths